The Kent State Golden Flashes women's golf team is an intercollegiate sport at Kent State University in Kent, Ohio, United States. The program was established in 1998 and competes in the National Collegiate Athletic Association at the Division I level as a member of the Mid-American Conference (MAC). Through the 2021–22 season, the Flashes have won 23 conference titles, all consecutively. Kent State is the only school to win the Mid-American Conference Women's Golf Championships, and has had team members win individual medalist honors in 18 of those years. The 23 consecutive MAC titles are a conference record for consecutive titles in any sport. In addition to their conference titles, Kent State has made 20 consecutive appearances in the NCAA Division I Women's Golf Championships, winning one regional title, advancing to the championship round seven times, and to the final match play round twice. The program's highest national finish is a tie for 5th in 2017 and 2018.

Windmill Lakes Golf Club in Ravenna serves as the program's home course and occasionally hosts matches. The main practice facility is the Page and Ferrara Golf Training and Learning Center, a  building located in Franklin Township, which the team shares with the men's golf team. The facility includes a  outdoor practice range, outdoor practice tees, and outdoor short-game practice areas as well as an indoor putting and chipping area, a video analysis room, and a Science and Motion Putt lab. In addition, the rear of the facility features heated stalls which allow team members to access the driving range year-round.

The Flashes' head coach is Casey VanDamme, who was hired in August 2021. VanDamme came from South Dakota State University, where he had previously served as the head coach for both the men's and women's golf programs. He is the Flashes' fourth head coach, succeeding Lisa Strom, who left in July 2021 to take the head coaching job at Ohio State. Strom was hired at KSU in July 2019 as the program's third head coach and replaced Greg Robertson, who left for Oklahoma State following the 2018–19 season. Prior to Robertson, the team was coached by Mike Morrow from its inception until 2013, then by men's golf coach Herb Page on an interim basis for the remainder of the 2012–13 season.

History
Plans for the team were first explored in 1995 as Kent State began looking into ways to increase women's athletic opportunities to be in compliance with Title IX.  The university ultimately decided to add women's soccer for 1997, golf for 1998, and tennis for 1999, though the tennis team was never realized. Mike Morrow, a Kent State alumnus who had played on the KSU men's golf team in the 1970s, was hired as the women's golf program first head coach in September 1997. The team played in their first match one year later, placing fourth out of 13 teams in the Mary Fossum Invitational at Forest Akers Golf Courses in East Lansing, Michigan, on September 12 and 13, 1998. In their second tournament one week later, the Flashes finished second out of 20 teams in the Huskie Classic in Genoa, Illinois, and the following week, Kent State claimed its first tournament win in program history, winning the Lady Falcon Invitational in Bowling Green, Ohio, held September 26 and 27. The Flashes won the inaugural Mid-American Conference Women's Golf Championships the following April, winning the team title by 25 strokes. Jan Dowling was MAC medalist, with teammates finishing second and tied for third in the individual competition. The 2008 MAC championship set the conference record for largest margin of victory, with KSU winning by 66 strokes.

Through the 2019 season, Kent State has won over 50 tournaments, including 21 MAC championships. Mike Morrow coached the team from its establishment in 1998 until January 2013, midway through the 2012–13 season, when he announced his retirement. Under Morrow, the team played in 166 events and won 31 of them, including 14 MAC championships, and advanced to the NCAA tournament 12 times, reaching the championship round in five of those years. Morrow was replaced for the remainder of the 2012–13 season by men's golf coach Herb Page on an interim basis, who guided the team to its 15th-consecutive MAC championship and 13th-consecutive appearance in the NCAA tournament. Greg Robertson, who had previously served as a women's golf assistant coach at Purdue, was hired as head coach in May 2013. In his six seasons as head coach, Robertson led the team to 26 team titles including a program-best six titles in 2015–16 and 2018–19. Included in the total are six more MAC championships and six appearances in the NCAA regional tournament, along with a regional title in 2019. The 2017 team advanced to the championship round for the first time since 2010 and had their best finish in program history, finishing in a tie for fifth after advancing to the match play round.

MAC championships
The Mid-American Conference added women's golf as a sponsored sport beginning in the 1998–99 season, with Kent State one of seven conference schools to begin offering the sport that season at the varsity level. The inaugural Mid-American Conference Women's Golf Championship was held in April 1999, which the Flashes won by 25 strokes. Through the 2022 championship, Kent State is the only conference member to ever win the conference meet, winning all 23 titles that have been contested. During the streak, the Flashes have won the tournament by as many as 66 strokes in 2002 and as few as four strokes in 2016, and have claimed the individual conference title in 18 of those years. Their 18th consecutive title in 2016 set a new MAC record for consecutive conference titles by a single school in any sport.

NCAA tournament
Kent State has made 21 consecutive appearances in the regional round of the NCAA Division I Women's Golf Championships through 2022, making their first tournament in 2001. They have advanced to the championship round eight times, most recently in 2021. The program's best placements were in 2017 and 2018 when they advanced to match play and finished tied for fifth nationally. Their previous best finish was in 2001, when the Flashes placed 15th in the championship round.

Head coaches

Awards
The Mid-American Conference has four awards, which are selected at the conference championship: Sportswoman of the Year, Golfer of the Year, Freshman of the Year, and Coach of the Year, along with the first team all-MAC, second team all-MAC, and all-tournament team. Sportswoman of the Year is selected by fellow players, while the other awards and honorary teams are selected by a vote of the head coaches. Pimnipa Panthong became the first player in conference history to win both the Golfer of the Year and Freshman of the Year honors, claiming both in 2017.

Facilities

It is mainly used for practices and while it has yet to be used for a women's golf tournament, it has hosted occasional men's tournaments, including the Mid-American Conference Men's Golf Championships in 1984 and 1993 and the FirstEnergy Intercollegiate as recently as 2008.

The facility, named after men's head coach Herb Page and philanthropists Emilio and Margaret Ferrara, includes a  outdoor putting green, a  practice range, along with practice fairways and tee areas, and heated bays that allow outdoor practice during winter months. Inside is a  practice green, team locker rooms, video room, offices, weight room, and a lounge and study area.

Notable alumni
Jan Dowling, 1998–2002, Canadian professional golfer on the LPGA Futures Tour from 2003 to 2005; collegiate head coach since 2010

References

External links